Roberto Salvador "Bob" Klapisch is a sportswriter for the Newark Star Ledger. He has previously written for The New York Times, New York Post, ESPN, Fox Sports and New York Daily News, and has written six books about baseball including the NYT best seller Inside The Empire: The True Power Behind the New York Yankees. He has been a voting member of the Baseball Writers' Association of America since 1983.

Klapisch was born in New York City and grew up in Leonia, New Jersey, where he attended Leonia High School. He was awarded a bachelor's degree, majoring in political science, from Columbia University, where he played varsity baseball and was sports editor of the university newspaper, the Columbia Daily Spectator.

In response to his book on the 1992 Mets, The Worst Team Money Could Buy: The Collapse of the New York Mets, New York Mets outfielder Bobby Bonilla confronted Klapisch in the team's clubhouse, threatening him, and having to be restrained. Klapisch is half-Brazilian and speaks Portuguese fluently.

References

Living people
American sportswriters
Columbia College (New York) alumni
Leonia High School alumni
People from Leonia, New Jersey
People from Teaneck, New Jersey
Year of birth missing (living people)